Nasvatn is a lake in the municipality of Åmli in Agder county, Norway. The lake has a small dam on the southwestern end, and the water leaving the lake goes down a large waterfall and eventually drains in the river Tovdalselva.

See also
List of lakes in Aust-Agder

References

Lakes of Agder
Åmli